Reazul Huq Chowdhury is a Bangladeshi politician. He was elected a member of parliament from Dinajpur-2 in 1988.

Career 
Chowdhury was elected to parliament from Dinajpur-2 as an independent candidate in 1988. He then joined the Jatiya party. He was defeated from Dinajpur-2 constituency on 12 June 1996 on the nomination of Jatiya party.

References 

Possibly living people
Year of birth missing (living people)
Living people
People from Dinajpur District, Bangladesh
Jatiya Party politicians
4th Jatiya Sangsad members